Drucker is a surname of German and Jewish origin, and may refer to:

Surname
Adam Drucker (born 1977), American rapper and poet, known by the stage name Doseone
Adolphus Drucker (1868–1903), Dutch-born English politician
Amy Drucker (1873–1951), British artist
Daniel C. Drucker (1918–2001), American engineer and academic
Daniel J. Drucker (born 1956), Canadian endocrinologist
Gerald Drucker (1925–2010), British bassist and photographer
Iosif Druker (1822–1879), Russian Jewish violin virtuoso, known by the popular name Stempenyu
Itzhak Drucker (born 1947), Israeli footballer
Léa Drucker (born 1972), French actress
Leon Drucker (born 1961), American bassist, known by the stage name of Lee Rocker, son of Stanley
Leopold Drucker (1903–1988), Austrian footballer and coach
Linda Ryke-Drucker, American poker player
Hendrik Lodewijk Drucker (1857–1917), Dutch politician
Jason Drucker (born 2005), American child actor
Jean Drucker, (1941–2003), French television executive
Jempy Drucker (born 1986), Luxembourgish racing cyclist
Jim Drucker (born 1952), American sports commissioner
Johanna Drucker (born 1952), American visual theorist and author
Malka Drucker (born 1945), American rabbi and author
Marie Drucker (born 1974), French journalist and author, daughter of Jean
Michel Drucker (born 1942), famous journalist, brother of Jean
Mike Drucker (born 1984), American comedian, writer, and producer
Mort Drucker (1929–2020), American cartoonist and caricaturist
Norm Drucker (1920–2015), American basketball referee
Paul Drucker (born 1945), American politician
Peter Drucker (1909–2005), Austrian author and economist
Philip Drucker (1911–1982), American anthropologist
Raviv Drucker (born 1970), Israeli journalist, brother of Sharon
Renate Drucker (1917–2009), German archivist
René Drucker Colín (1937–2017), Mexican neuroscientist and journalist
Sharon Drucker (born 1967), Israeli basketball coach, brother of Raviv
Stanley Drucker (1929–2022), retired principal clarinetist of the New York Philharmonic, father of Leon
Steven M. Drucker, American computer scientist
Wilhelmina Drucker (1847–1925), Dutch feminist and writer
Zackary Drucker (born 1983), American director, actress, and trans activist

See also
Drucker School of Management, business college of Claremont Graduate University in Claremont, California, United States
Druckers Vienna Patisserie, chain of pâtisserie bakeries in the United Kingdom

German-language surnames
Jewish surnames